Maria Sharapova was the last champion of the event in 2008, but chose not to compete.

Vera Zvonareva won the final against World No. 1 Caroline Wozniacki 6–4, 6–4.

Seeds
The top four seeds received a bye into the second round.

Draw

Finals

Top half

Bottom half

Qualifying draw

Players

Seeds

Qualifiers

Lucky losers

Results

First qualifier

Second qualifier

Third qualifier

Fourth qualifier

References
 Main Draw
 Qualifying Draw

2011 WTA Tour
2011 Qatar Ladies Open – 1
2011 in Qatari sport